Smart Money may refer to:

Smart Money (1931 film), a 1931 American motion picture
Smart Money (1986 film), a 1986 BBC film
SmartMoney, a financial magazine

See also
Smart money index, used for financial analysis